The Rivière des Pins (English: River of the Pines) is a tributary of the Nicolet River which flows on the south bank of the Saint Lawrence River. The Pins River flows through the municipalities of Saint-Rémi-de-Tingwick, Tingwick, Warwick and Saint-Albert-de-Warwick, in the regional county municipality (MRC) of Arthabaska, in the region of Centre-du-Québec, in Quebec, in Canada.

Geography 

The main hydrographic slopes neighboring the "Rivière des Pins" areː
 north side ː Nicolet River;
 east side Noir Noir stream, Nicolet River;
 south side Des Desrochers stream, rivière des Rosiers, Truite stream;
 west side ː Nicolet River South-West, rivière des Rosiers.

The "Rivière des Pins" originates from several agricultural and forestry streams in the municipality of Saint-Rémi-de-Tingwick. This area is located to the northwest of the route from range 8th and 9th.

From its head zone, the Rivière des Pins flows over  according to the following segmentsː
  south-east, then west, to the municipal limit of Tingwick;
  north-west, up to the route du 6th rang;
  north-west, up to Chemin Craig;
  north-west, up to Gleasson Road;
  north-west, up to the municipal limit of Warwick;
  south-west, up to the Chemin de Warwick bridge, located south-east of the village of Warwick;
  to the west, bypassing the village of Warwick to the south, to the Chemin de Warwick bridge (located northwest of the village );
  north-west, up to the confluence of the Laroche stream (coming from the east);
  towards the north-west, to its mouth.

Toponymy 

The toponym "Rivière des Pins" was formalized on December 5, 1968 at the Commission de toponymie du Québec.

See also 

 List of rivers of Quebec

Notes and references 

Arthabaska Regional County Municipality
Rivers of Centre-du-Québec